France built a series of ironclad warships between the 1850s and 1890s; these began with the  ironclad floating batteries built during the Crimean War, which presaged , the first sea-going ironclad to be built by any navy.

Broadside ironclads
  5,603 tons.
  (1859) – world's first ocean-going ironclad, stricken 1879.
  (1861) – stricken 1872.
  (1860) – stricken 1871.
  (1861) 5,983 tons – hulked 1910.
  6,715 tons.
  (1861) – sank after internal explosion 1875.
  (1861) – stricken 1882.
  5,700 – 6,122 tons.
  (1863) – stricken 1884.
  (1863) – hulked 1894.
  (1864) – stricken 1886.
  (1863) – stricken 1888.
  (1864) – stricken 1882.
  (1864) – stricken 1890.
  (1864) – stricken 1886.
  (1865) – stricken 1883.
  (1865) – BU (broken up) 1893.
  (1865) – stricken 1882.
  (1865) 3,717 tons – expended as a target 1886.

Central battery ships
  3,513–3,828 tons.
  (1867) – hulked 1886.
  (1867) – stricken 1887.
  (1868) – stricken 1887.
  (1867) – stricken 1883.
  (1868) ex- – stricken 1891.
  (1868) – stricken 1886.
  (1867) – stricken 1895.
  7,580/7,775 tons.
  (1868) – stricken 1894.
  (1869) – sold 1896.
  (1870) – stricken 1897.
  ( 4,585–4,645 tons.
  (1872) – stricken 1894.
  (1877) – sold 1903.
  (1875) – hulked 1900.
  (1873) 8,850 tons – stricken 1902.
  (1873) 8,984 tons – sold 1901, sank in the Bay of Biscay after sale.
  8,750 tons.
  (1875) – stricken 1900.
  (1876) – hulked 1904.
  (1876) 9,224 tons, first warship in the world to use steel as the principal building material – stricken 1910.
  10,450 tons.
  (1879) – BU 1922.
  (1882)  ex- – stricken 1910.

Barbette ships

  (1879) 11,030 tons.  Though this ship was designed for sail as well as steam power, her sails were removed before completion. – stricken 1909.
  5,915–6,260 tons.  Smaller versions of Amiral Duperré, with full sail power.
  (1880) – hulked 1899.
  (1879) – stricken 1901.
  6,112 tons.  Improved Bayards.
  (1883) – stricken 1904.
  (1882) – stricken 1905.
  11,720 tons, the first French sea-going battleships without any sail power.
  (1883) – hulked 1909.
  (1885) – stricken 1911.
  or Indomptable class, 7,530 tons. Small battleships based on the Amiral Baudin, and intended for operating in the Baltic in case of war with Germany.  The British sometimes considered these to be sea-going battleships, and sometimes coastal service warships.
  (1885) – BU 1927.
  (1883) – BU 1927.
  (1885) – stricken 1920.
  (1887) – stricken 1911.
  (1886) 10,820 tons, turrets & barbettes – target 1913.
  10,558–10,810 tons.
  (1887) – BU 1922.
  (1890) – stricken 1910.
  (1887) – stricken 1913.
  10,600–10,650 tons, slightly enlarged Marceaus.
  (-) laid down 1883, construction suspended 1886.
   (-) laid down 1884, construction suspended 1886.

Floating batteries
  built for the Crimean War 1,600 tons.
  – stricken 1867
  (1855) – stricken 1871.
  (1855) – stricken 1871.
  (1855) – stricken 1871.
  (1855) – stricken 1871.
  1,508–1,539 tons.
  (1862) – stricken 1871.
  (1862) – stricken 1871.
  (1862) – stricken 1871.
  (1862) – stricken 1871.
  1,412-1.490 tons.
  (1864) – stricken 1881.
  (1864) – stricken 1884.
  (1864) – stricken 1885.
  1,426–1,589 tons.
  (1865) – stricken 1885.
  (1867) – stricken 1882.
  (1866) – stricken 1889.
  (1866) – stricken 1884.

Casemate ironclad
  (1865) ex- 7,800 tons, purchased 1867 – stricken 1872.

Coastal defense ships
  (1865) barbette ship ram 2,433 tons – stricken 1890.
  (1863) ex- 2,551 tons, purchased 1867 – stricken 1904.
  3,532 tons.
  (1870) – stricken 1896.
  (1872) – stricken 1897.
  (1868) – stricken 1887.
  (1871) – stricken 1892.
  ,1st Class Coastal Battleship, 5,765–5,871 tons.
  (1875) – stricken 1905.
  (1877) – stricken 1908.
  (1883) barbette ship 5,925 tons.  Similar to Tonnant for the same reasons. – stricken 1913.
 , 2nd Class Coastal Battleship, 4.635-4,793 tons.
  (1876) – stricken 1907.
  (1878) – stricken 1905.
  (1880) barbette ship 5,010 tons.  Originally intended to be similar to Tempête, but redesigned as a small battleship with increased freeboard and a gun at each end in barbettes. – stricken 1903.
  6,681 tons.
  (1893) – stricken 1922.
  (1892) – stricken 1920.
  6,476 tons.
  (1892) – hulked 1911.
  (1892) – stricken 1911.
  (1899) 8,807 tons – stricken 1921.

See also
 List of ironclads

Citations

Ironclad
France